Alan Thynne (16 October 1928 – 9 June 1971) was an Australian rules footballer who played for the Carlton Football Club in the Victorian Football League (VFL).

Following the end of his career with Carlton, Thynne spent three years with Victorian Football Association (VFA) club Camberwell, playing 42 games.

Notes

External links 

Alan Thynne's profile at Blueseum

1928 births
Carlton Football Club players
1971 deaths
Australian rules footballers from Victoria (Australia)
Camberwell Football Club players